General elections were held in Ghana on 7 December 2016 to elect a President and Members of Parliament. They had originally been scheduled for 7 November 2016, but the date was later rejected by Parliament. Former foreign minister Nana Akufo-Addo of the opposition New Patriotic Party was elected President on his third attempt, defeating incumbent President John Mahama of the National Democratic Congress.

The election results were announced on 9 December 2016 due to a delay of voting in two areas. At 19:51 local time, Mahama called Akufo-Addo to concede defeat. At 20:45, the Electoral Commission declared that Akufo-Addo had defeated Mahama in a single round. It was the first time in Ghana's history that a sitting president had been defeated for reelection.

Electoral system
The president is elected using the two-round system, whilst the 275 members of Parliament are elected in single-member constituencies using first-past-the-post voting.

Eligible voters must be Ghanaian citizens aged 18 or over, although those declared insane are disenfranchised. Parliamentary candidates must be Ghanaian citizens at least 21 years old, and either be resident in their constituency or have lived there for at least five of the ten years prior to the election.

Campaign

Presidential candidates
Over 16 people filed with the election commission to run for president. However, 13 presidential candidates were disqualified due to incorrect filing procedures. The disqualified candidates included former first lady Nana Konadu Agyeman Rawlings, the president of the National Democratic Party. There was some controversy due to allegations that the candidates were disqualified for political reasons. The Electoral Commission denied all accusations. After the disqualification, only four presidential candidates remained. However, the presidential candidate of the Progressive People's Party (PPP) Paa Kwesi Nduom took the EC to court over his disqualification. The court finally ruled in his favour, allowing him to join the race. Two other candidates who were disqualified also followed suit, leading to there being seven candidates.

Ivor Greenstreet from the Convention People's Party was the first physically challenged candidate to contest a presidential election.

Incumbent John Mahama was eligible for a second full term since he had ascended to the presidency with only six months remaining in the term of his predecessor and running mate, John Atta Mills. In Ghana, when a vice-president ascends to the presidency with more than half of a presidential term remaining, he is only allowed to run for a single full term in his own right. If more than half of the term has expired, the vice-president is eligible for two full terms.

Parliamentary candidates
A total of 1,144 candidates contested the 275 seats in Parliament. The NDC and NPP both ran full slates of 275 candidates, whilst the CPP (222 candidates) and PPP (163) were the only two other parties to run in over half the seats. The PNC nominated 64 candidates, the NDP 33, the APC 20, the GCPP 10, the UFP six and the DPP and UPP both had only one candidate. The other 74 candidates were independents.

Opinion polls

Presidential

Results

President

By region

Parliament

See also
List of MPs elected in the 2016 Ghanaian parliamentary election

References

Ghana
2016 in Ghana
December 2016 events in Africa
Elections in Ghana
Presidential elections in Ghana
Election and referendum articles with incomplete results